Pehchaan is a 2022 Pakistani television series produced by Momina Duraid for Hum TV, written by Rubina Kabir Khan and directed by Asad Jabal. It focuses on women's role in a building and maintaining a relation and the identity crisis they face. It aired from 9 June 2022 to 2 September 2022.

The plot revolves around Sharmeen aka Kukki who wants divorce from his husband and doesn't tell its reason to anybody. The series features Hiba Bukhari,, Syed Jibran, Mirza Zain Baig, Nadia Khan and Eshal Fayyaz in leading roles. The series is set in Istanbul, Turkey and Karachi, Pakistan.

Plot

Kukki is an ambitious housewife who lives with her husband Adnan and children Hamna and Fahad in Istanbul. One day, after learning that Adnan had been cheating on her, she decides to visit Pakistan alone as her husband is occupied with work and her children are preparing for their exams. When Adnan's sister, Shaheena, reaches the airport to meet Kukki and doesn't find her, the whole family worries about her disappearance. Eventually, they come to assume she had gone somewhere by her own free will after learning about her meeting with Aziz Waqar, the man who wished to marry her before her marriage to Adnan. Aziz and Kukki has a long history of interactions as Aziz's sister Nargis was Kukki's best friend. Dur to these interactions, Aziz had started developing feelings for Kukki while she rejected him as she was interested in Adnan.

Adnan reaches Pakistan and his children come to learn about their mother's disappearance. He goes to Aziz's house looking for Kukki but there he is busy in wedding preparations and also invites Adnan for his marriage.

Kukki returns home and everyone questions her but she keeps quite and calm. When Adnan learns of her arrival, he comes along with his parents but she does not talk him and denies to meet. Later, it revealed that Kukki had gone to her aunt, Safina's house who lives alone in her house due to some conflicts with his brother (Kukki's father) as he didn't not allow her to fulfill her dreams and become glimpse of his honour.

After living some days in her parent's house, she returns to Safina's house and Adnan returns to Turkey but he keeps trying to solve the matter. When Shahina (Adnan's sister) comes to give her some amount for her livelihood, she denies to accept it as she has joined a school as a teacher. When Aziz learns that Sharmeen's marriage is in danger, he calls off her engagement due to his one sided live for her and visits Sharmeen along with her parents and Nargis to find out the problem. But she doesn't tell anything to anyone and tells them to not worry about her. She gets sad after noticing that in the whole time, her children has not tried to contact her.

With a minor help of Aziz, she then starts her own food service in Safina's house and decides to take divorce legally. When her father learns of it, he decides to stand by his daughter as he didn't want to do with his daughter, what he did with his sister. He visits her and assures her his support if Adnan makes the mistaken. On the other hand, Kehkeshan meets Adnan in Istanbul where she reveals to him that her husband divorced her when he discovered his affair with him. She offers him to marry her which he declines saying that he loves Kukki, the mother of his children. She tells him that Kukki has left him because she has tell everything to her including that Kukki is her nickname that Adnan has given to Sharmeen. The things that he liked for Kehkeshan didn't allow Kukki to do them.

Cast

 Hiba Bukhari as Sharmeen "Kukki" Adnan
 Syed Jibran as Adnan, Sharmeen's husband
 Mirza Zain Baig as Aziz Waqar, brother of Sharmeen's friend who is in one-sided love with her
 Nadia Khan as Safina, sister of Sharmeen's father
 Sajida Syed as Adnan's mother
 Syed Mohammad Ahmed as Adnan's father
 Huma Nawab as Bano, Sharmeen's mother
 Qavi Khan as Sharmeen's father
 Nadia Hussain as Shaheena, Adnan's sister
 Sadaf Aashan as Saba, Sharmeen's sister
 Sohail Sameer as Haider, Sharmeen's brother
 Hajra Khan as Fareeha, Haider's wife
 Eshal Fayyaz as Kehkeshan, Adnan's ex 
 Inaya Khan as Nargis, Aziz's sister
 Aadi Khan as Umer, Shaheena's son
 Anoushey Rania Khan as Faryal, Haider and Fareeha's daughter
 Aina Asif as Hamna, Sharmeen and Adnan's daughter
 Ahmed Usman as Fahad, Sharmeen and Adnan's son
 Diya Mughal as Hina, Sharmeen's sister
 Usman Mazhar as Hameed, Hina's husband
 Salma Asim as mother of Nargis and Aziz

Guest 
 Asad Mumtaz Malik as Detective Dilshad (Episode 4)
 Birjees Farooqui as Kehkeshan's mother (Episode 9)
 Noor ul Hassan as Kehkeshan's father (Episode 9)
 Tooba Anwar as fiancée of Aziz (episodes 21 & 26)

Soundtrack

Production

Development 
In March 2022, it was reported that Hiba Bukhari and Nadia Khan would star as leading roles in director Asad Jabal's next project. In preparation for her role, Khan learnt the dance Kathak.

Reception

Television ratings

Critical reception 
The website Galaxy Lollywood gave a positive review of the first episode, noting several performances, in particular Bukhari's. The News gave the storyline an average rating but praised Bukhari's performance and termed it "the only redeeming quality". Another reviewer from the same newspaper also praised Bukhari's performance and gave an appreciable review of the first 6-8 episodes stating, "Over the span of a few episodes, Pehchaan had done a really good job of creating fleshed out characters and a sense of mystery". Maliha Rehman of Dawn praised its story and said that stereotypes that are challenged in it make it unique even. Further, she described it as, "the sort of story that needs to be told to a mass audience."

References

External links 
 Official website

2022 Pakistani television series debuts